Addams Stratton McAllister (February 24, 1875 – November 26, 1946) was an American  electrical engineer and editor.

Career 
He was educated at Pennsylvania State College (B.S. 1898; E.E., 1900) and at Cornell University (M.M.E., 1901; Ph.D., 1905).

He was employed by the Berwind-White Coal Mining Company in 1898 and by the Westinghouse Electric and Manufacturing Company in 1899.  He was associate editor (1905–12) and thereafter editor of the Electrical World.  He contributed many articles on engineering subjects to technical publications. In 1915, he was president of the Illuminating Engineering Society.

In 1921 he joined the Bureau of Standards as a liaison officer, progressing in 1926 to head the Division of Specifications and to Assistant Director in 1929. The bureau's Standards Yearbooks from 1927 to 1933 were published under his direction. He retired in February 1945.

He was inducted as a Fellow of the American Physical Society in 1929.

Bibliography

Books 

 Alternating Current Motors (1906; third edition, 1909) McGraw-Hill Book Co; Enlarged. 
 Standard Handbook for Electrical Engineers (1907)
 The Descendants of John Thomson, Pioneer Scotch Covenanter (2018) Forgotten Books

References 

1875 births
1946 deaths
Engineers from Virginia
American science writers
Cornell University College of Engineering alumni
People from Covington, Virginia
Penn State College of Engineering alumni
Fellows of the American Physical Society